Mose Lafayette Bashaw (April 15, 1889 – June 5, 1933) was an American football tackle who played one season in the American Professional Football Association with the Hammond Pros.

References

External links
Just Sports Stats

1889 births
1933 deaths
American football tackles
Hammond Pros players
People from Wayne County, New York